Herbert Broughall Lipsham (29 April 1878 – 23 March 1932) was a professional footballer who won the 1902 FA Cup Final with Sheffield United.

Club career

Educated at the King's School, Chester Lipsham was a goal-scoring outside left. He began by playing in his home city with Chester St Oswalds before making his debut for Chester in the 1895–96 season. He was one of four brothers to play for Chester, with the others including Jack who went on to play for Liverpool.

After a spell with Rockferry, Lipsham joined Crewe Alexandra in the 1898–99 season as a professional and was an immediate success. So much so that Derby County, Notts County and Sheffield United showed an immediate interest in him.

Crewe were not anxious to part with him, but a substantial offer induced them to transfer him to Sheffield United in 1900. After that, he was an invaluable member of the successful Blades team of that period. A quiet, unassuming and well-behaved young man, he was famous for his hard-hit crosses, which produced a lot of goals for his central strikers. Lipsham played in the successful FA Cup Final team when Sheffield United beat Southampton 2–1 in a replay on 26 April 1902. He moved to Fulham in 1908.

Managerial career
Lipsham was appointed manager at Millwall on  4 May 1911, retaining the position until the First World War.

International career

Lipsham was capped by England against Wales on 3 March 1902, aged 23 years.

Other information

He also had a tobacconist shop at 142 Bramall Lane.

Lipsham was a member of the first management committee of the PFA and later moved to Canada where he became involved in the development of football.

Honours

Sheffield United

 FA Cup winner: 1902
 FA Cup finalist: 1901

References

External links

Biography on EnglandFootballOnline
Clarebrough, Denis. Sheffield United official matchday programme, March 1989.

1878 births
1932 deaths
Sportspeople from Chester
People educated at The King's School, Chester
English footballers
England international footballers
Sheffield United F.C. players
Crewe Alexandra F.C. players
Chester City F.C. players
Fulham F.C. players
Millwall F.C. players
English Football League players
English football managers
Millwall F.C. managers
English Football League representative players
Association football midfielders
FA Cup Final players